White Dwarf is a 1995 American science fiction thriller television film directed by Peter Markle and starring Paul Winfield, Neal McDonough, CCH Pounder, Beverley Mitchell, David St. James, Ele Keats, and James Morrison. It was written by Bruce Wagner, who also executive produced with Robert Halmi Sr. and Francis Ford Coppola for RHI Entertainment, Elemental Films, and American Zoetrope. 
Originally intended as a television pilot, the film first aired on the Fox Network on May 23, 1995.  While expected to be well received, the film instead garnered generally negative reception.  Negative reception notwithstanding, it received an ASC Award nomination for Outstanding Achievement in Cinematography.

Plot
In the year 3040, New York medical student Driscoll Rampart (Neal McDonough) is completing his internship on Rusta, a rural planet which due to it being tidally locked to its primary, is divided into contrasting halves of day and night with the halves separated by a wall. The two sides are involved in a civil war: The day side containing a Victorian-styled colony is at odds with the night containing a medieval kingdom. The differences between the two cultures leaves Rampart in a state of wonder. Rampart arrives from Earth for a six-month stint at the Light Side clinic run by Dr. Akada (Paul Winfield).  Rampart's ambition is to eventually set up a private practice in Manhattan on Park Avenue.

Cast
 Paul Winfield as Dr. Akada
 Neal McDonough as Dr. Driscoll Rampart
 Ele Keats as Ariel
 CCH Pounder as Nurse Shabana
 David St. James as King Joist's Royal Guard
 James Morrison as Peter
 Katy Boyer as Lady X, Immortal Prisoner
 Kevin Brophy as Orderly
 Marsha Dietlein as Emma
 Michael McGrady as Lieutenant Strake
 Robert O. Cornthwaite as King Joist of The Dark Side
 Roy Brocksmith as Guv'ner Twist
 Thomas F. Duffy as Parasite Man
 Giuseppe Andrews as Never The Shifter
 Beverley Mitchell as XuXu, Older Twin
 Time Winters as The David
 Chip Heller as Osh, Warden of The Keep
 John Dennis Johnston as Morgus, Osh's Assistant
 Gary Watkins as Marshall Bardaker
 Maggie Baird as Scarred Cultist
 Ralph Drischell as Dr. Gulpha, King Joist's Advisor
 Kirk Ward as Samuel
 Tara Graham as XaXa, Younger Twin
 Maya McLaughlin as Armanda, Rampart's Late Wife
 Tycho Thal as Twist's Servant

Production
Paul Winfield willingly accepted a pay cut to be part of this film. Said Winfield, "I thought it was a (feature film). I'm a real sci-fi nut. Even as a kid, that was my pleasure, reading science fiction. I read Heinlein, the big anthologies, Asimov. I've always liked science-fiction movies too. I like being in them, just to see how they do it."  He expanded that during filming, the film "sort of started to have a life of its own."

Bruce Wagner claims his inspiration was drawn from the cover-art of science-fiction novels. Having a limited budget, the project was shot at multiple locations within 40 miles of Los Angeles: scenes of the prison were constructed in the same location where Los Angeles Herald-Examiner once housed its printing presses; outdoor scenes were shot at a ranch location north of LA; scenes of Dr. Akada's clinic were done at school in Arcadia, California; and the film's sea scenes were shot off the coast of Malibu with the ocean's red tint added in post production.

Releases
The film originally aired May 23, 1995 on the Fox Network.

Reception
The film was reviewed as having promise, but received generally negative reviews. 
The New York Times wrote that the film began with a "shamelessly incredible premise" which "takes off into a wholly unbelievable stratosphere". They also observed that the film's collection of protagonists and antagonists do nothing to improve it, and while keeping track of them is "often exasperating", it "is hardly boring. The film's offers decent special effects, but the soundtrack by Stewart Copeland "is curiously inept", and its actors "give readings as lifeless as departure announcements for the Long Island Rail Road."

TV Guide granted the film offered a "broad panorama" with a "rich, detailed setting" but the setting was unable to "compensate for the lack of a coherent plot."  They expanded that the film's representation of a split culture "is evenly handled, with neither side portrayed as wholly good or bad", but concluded that "the film's potential is badly marred by an incoherent plot which is unable to sustain the setting and characters. Dramatic conflicts are practically non-existent and the various plots are given too little time to develop." The film has action, but it is not relevant to the thin plot, and what few moments of potential momentum is lost with characters "who discover things too soon or resolve things too easily."

Baltimore Sun wrote that the film's premise of Northern Exposure set on a distant planet and dressed in the language of myth and fairy tale was "lame, tedious, tired, obvious."  The film failed to live up to its potential, was "not quirky, clever, kicky or imaginative", and is determined as a "careless and uninspired attempt to rework the hero quest" from Francis Ford Coppola (Apocalypse Now) and Bruce Wagner (Wild Palms), "two executive producers capable of much better work".

Chicago Tribune noted Bruce Wagner joining with Francis Ford Coppola to create White Dwarf as a two-hour TV-movie and pilot for a possible series. They note the differences between the light and dark side cultures, with the light half mixing various culture's styles and periods, "with elements of the Old West, Victorian era and 20th century, including stagecoaches and radios.  The dark half is medieval, with a king, a princess and an evil knight. They noted the film having "some spectacular computer-generated effects (especially the wall between the light and dark sides)", but according to Bruce Wagner, that was not an aspect upon which he wished to concentrate. Said Wagner, "The wall looks hot. The stuff that we did looks great, but I wanted to keep it limited. I didn't care so much about it. I wanted to create a template for our pilot where things were more emotional. I loved the stuff between Osh and Lady X. I'm enthralled every time I see those little scenes with Wagner playing in the background, this two-ton walrus alien obsessing over this gorgeous, ancient woman. And this whole scene where (Akada and Rampart) are examining her and she says, `Do you know what it's like to live forever?' I just love that stuff. When she elucidates what it is like to live forever... I really find that moving every time I hear her do that. There are little side stories that, to me, are really cool."

New York Daily News wrote that Bruce Wagner's "Futuristic White Dwarf is a fuzt dud." Their complaint was toward how illogical it was that in a time when interstellar travel was commonplace, dependence on stagecoaches and horseback was nonsense, and the "medical facilities, equipment and medications seem as primitive as the transportation system." They concluded the "participation of Francis Ford Coppola and Robert Halmi Sr. as executive producers with Wagner, as well as a fine production team, still doesn't make this movie worth more than about the 30 seconds it takes to watch one of Fox' promos for it."

Awards and nominations
 Received a 1995 ASC Awards nomination for Outstanding Achievement in Cinematography in Movies of the Week or Pilot

References

External links
 
 

1995 television films
1995 films
1995 science fiction films
1995 thriller films
1990s American films
1990s English-language films
1990s science fiction thriller films
American science fiction television films
American science fiction thriller films
American space adventure films
American thriller television films
American Zoetrope films
Films directed by Peter Markle
Films scored by Stewart Copeland
Films set in the future
Films set in the 31st century
Films set on fictional planets
Films shot in Los Angeles
Films shot in Malibu, California
Fox network original films
Sonar Entertainment films
Television pilots not picked up as a series